The 2020 Los Angeles FC season was the club's third season in Major League Soccer, the top tier of the American soccer pyramid. Los Angeles FC played their home matches at the Banc of California Stadium in the Exposition Park neighborhood of Los Angeles. Outside of MLS play, the team planned to participate in the 2020 U.S. Open Cup tournament (before the tournament's cancelation due to the COVID-19 pandemic) and qualified for the 2020 CONCACAF Champions League, reaching the final.

Squad

First-team roster

Transfers

Transfers in

Transfers out

Draft picks

Competitions

Exhibitions

Major League Soccer

Standings

Western Conference

MLS is Back – Group F

Overall

Results 
All times are Pacific.

MLS is Back Tournament

MLS Cup Playoffs

CONCACAF Champions League

Round of 16

Quarter-finals

Semi-finals

Final

U.S. Open Cup 

Due to their final standings position for the 2019 MLS season, Los Angeles FC was to enter the competition in the Fourth Round, to be played May 19–20. However, it was announced on August 14, 2020, that the tournament would be canceled due to the COVID-19 Pandemic.

Player statistics

Appearances and goals
Last updated on November 1, 2020

|-
! colspan=14 style=background:#dcdcdc; text-align:center|Goalkeepers

|-
! colspan=14 style=background:#dcdcdc; text-align:center|Defenders

|-
! colspan=14 style=background:#dcdcdc; text-align:center|Midfielders

|-
! colspan=14 style=background:#dcdcdc; text-align:center|Forwards

|-
! colspan=14 style=background:#dcdcdc; text-align:center| Players who have made an appearance or had a squad number this season but have left the club

|-
|}

References

2020
2020 Major League Soccer season
American soccer clubs 2020 season
2020 in sports in California
2020 in Los Angeles
2020 CONCACAF Champions League participants seasons